Viva Saturn was a rock group from Los Angeles, California, founded by former members of Rain Parade.

History
When Rain Parade decided to take a break in 1988, Steven Roback formed a new project, Viva Saturn, with fellow Rain Paraders John Thoman and Will Glenn. The band's first release, a mini-LP called Viva Saturn, was released in 1989. The next year, after Glenn left to join David Roback's Mazzy Star, the band moved to San Francisco, where Rain Parade co-founder Matt Piucci koined to produce and play guitar. 

Over the next few years the band used various musicians, including Ross Inden (bass guitar) and Carlo Nuccio (drums) to record a series of notable neo-psychedelic albums, including Soundmind (1992), featuring guest appearances from Green on Red's Jack Waterson and Chris Cacavas, and Barbara Manning of 28th Day. This was followed in 1995 with the more pop, but still electro-acoustic psychedelia-rooted Brightside album. The band recorded a final album, Ships of Heaven, in 1998, but this has not been released. 

After Viva Saturn, Roback embarked on solo recording projects, joined by his former Rain Parade bandmantes Piucci and Thoman.

Discography
Viva Saturn (1989) Heyday/World Service
Soundmind (1994) Heyday/Normal
Brightside (1995) Restless
Ships of Heaven (1998) (unreleased)

References

Musical groups from Los Angeles
Alternative rock groups from California
Musical groups established in 1989
Musical groups disestablished in 1998
1989 establishments in California
1998 disestablishments in California